Maxim Viktorovich Korshunov (born 1977) is a Russian swimmer who won a bronze medal in the 4 × 200 m freestyle relay at the 1999 European Aquatics Championships.

He graduated in 2002 from the Moscow Sports Academy with a swimming coach degree and since 2001 works as a swimming coach. He continues to compete in swimming, in the masters category.

References

1977 births
Living people
Russian male freestyle swimmers
Tajikistani male freestyle swimmers
Swimmers at the 2002 Asian Games
European Aquatics Championships medalists in swimming
Asian Games competitors for Tajikistan
20th-century Russian people
21st-century Russian people